Walter Becker (1950–2017) was the co-founder, guitarist, bassist and co-songwriter of American band Steely Dan

Walter Becker may also refer to:

Walt Becker (born 1968), American director, writer and actor
Walter Becker (cyclist) (1932–2012), German cyclist